Harvie and the Magic Museum is a 2017 3D computer-animated comedy fantasy film based on the Czech Spejbl and Hurvínek puppet comedy duo.

Premise 
Harvie, a troubled ten-year old boy, accidentally activates the legendary magic disc that brings puppets to life. However, this also brings back the mad puppeteer who wants to turn the entire city and all its inhabitants into his own puppet stage, and only Harvie can stop him.

Production 
Production for the film lasted seven years. With a budget of 170,000,000 CZK ($8,000,000), it was the fifth most expensive Czech film at the time of its release, and the most expensive animated Czech film.

Release and reception 
The film was released in the Czech Republic and Slovakia on 31 August 2017, and had a worldwide gross of $2,079,037. In the Czech Republic, it opened with $354,048 for a total gross of $1,007,954; in Slovakia, it opened with $2,265 for a total of $61,859. The film was released in Russia on 7 March 2019. It was boycotted by the Association of Cinema Owners and three other networks due to the lobbying of the film by the Ministry of Culture of the Russian Federation. Because of this, the film was a box office bomb, grossing $235,105 in its opening weekend for a total gross of $468,680.

The film received generally negative reviews from critics.

The UK and Irish DVD release markets the film as a Halloween movie.

See also 
List of animated feature films of 2017
List of most expensive Czech films

References

External links 

2017 animated films
2017 films
Belgian animated films
Czech animated films
Czech fantasy comedy films
Czech animated comedy films
Czech animated fantasy films